Pasqual Sanchis Moscardó (born 1963 in El Genovés) was a Valencian pilota professional player known as Pigat II. Son of the Raspall player Pigat I and brother of Pigat III, Pasqual has been a renowned "dauer" in the Escala i corda variety. He retired in 2000, but he keeps working for the Valencian Pilota Federation as the coach of the Valencian Pilota Squad, where he was a relevant player in the International Championships. Pigat II is also a technical assistant of the pilota company ValNet, and a "trinqueter" of some trinquets.

Trophies

As a pilotari 
 Winner of the Campionat Nacional d'Escala i Corda 1985 and 1987
 Runner-up of the Campionat Nacional d'Escala i Corda 1989
 Winner of the Circuit Bancaixa 1993, 1995 and 1996
 Runner-up of the Circuit Bancaixa 1994 and 1999
 Runner-up of the Trofeu Individual Bancaixa 1998 and 1999.

Handball International Championships
 Runner-up of Llargues and International game at the European Championship, France 1994
 Winner of Llargues at the World Championship, Spain 1996
 Winner of Llargues at the World Championship, France 1998
 Winner of Llargues at the European Championship, Italy 1999
 Winner of Llargues at the World Championship, Spain 2000

As a coach 
 Winner of the Frontó and International game at the European Championship, France 2003
 Runner-up of Llargues, France 2003
 Winner of Llargues at the World Championship, Italy 2004
 Winner of the International game at the European Championship, Belgium 2007
 Runner-up of Llargues, Belgium 2007
 Absolute champion, Belgium 2007

References

1963 births
Living people
People from Costera
Sportspeople from the Province of Valencia
Pilotaris from the Valencian Community